The Savegre River is a river in Costa Rica that flows to the Pacific Ocean. It is considered one of the cleanest rivers in the country. Its basin is one of the most eco-diverse regions of Costa Rica: 47 different ecosystems have been identified in it, of which 9 are natural, 15 semi-natural and 23 cultural, for what most of the basin is protected by the Los Quetzales National Park and the Manuel Antonio National Park. On June 14, 2017, the Savegre river basin was declared a Biosphere Reserve by UNESCO.

See also
List of rivers of Costa Rica

References

External links
 For information about rafting the Savegre River.

Other coordinates: 

Rivers of Costa Rica